The 2012–13 Duke Blue Devils men's basketball team represented Duke University in the 2012–13 NCAA Division I men's basketball season. Returning as head coach was Hall of Famer Mike Krzyzewski. The team played its home games at Cameron Indoor Stadium in Durham, North Carolina as members of the Atlantic Coast Conference. They won the Battle 4 Atlantis tournament in the Bahamas, defeating Louisville in the championship game. The Blue Devils posted four victories against top 5 opponents (at the time of the game) and were undefeated (16-0) at home. Completing the season with 30 wins (and 6 losses; 14–4 in ACC play), Duke finished in second place in the ACC regular season standings. Duke was ranked in the top 10 of the AP poll all season long, including five weeks at #1. They lost in the quarterfinals of the ACC tournament to Maryland and subsequently received a two seed in the 2013 NCAA tournament. They defeated Albany in the Round of 64, #22 Creighton in the Round of 32, and #9 Michigan State in the Sweet Sixteen to reach the Elite Eight. Duke lost to #1 overall seed and eventual NCAA champion Louisville in the Elite Eight in Indianapolis who reversed the game result from the meeting earlier in the season. Louisville later had the title vacated for a violation of NCAA rules.  Duke won the 2012-13 RPI National Championship for finishing #1 in final RPI Rankings.

Class of 2012 signees

Roster

Depth chart

Schedule

|-
!colspan=12 style="background:#00009C; color:#FFFFFF;"| Exhibition

|-
!colspan=12 style="background:#00009C; color:#FFFFFF;"| Non-conference regular season

|-
!colspan=12 style="background:#00009C; color:#FFFFFF;"| ACC Regular Season
|-

|-
!colspan=12 style="background:#00009C; color:#FFFFFF;"| 2013 ACC Tournament

|-
!colspan=12 style="background:#00009C; color:#FFFFFF;"| 2013 NCAA Tournament

Rankings

References

Duke
Duke Blue Devils men's basketball seasons
Duke
Duke
Duke